Sleidinge is a railway station in Sleidinge, East Flanders, Belgium.  The station opened on 25 June 1861 on the Line 58. The train services are operated by NMBS/SNCB.

Train services
The station is served by the following service(s):

Local services (L-05) Eeklo - Ghent - Oudenaarde - Ronse
Local services (L-05) Eeklo - Ghent - Oudenaarde - Kortrijk (weekdays)

References

Railway stations in Belgium
Railway stations opened in 1861
1861 establishments in Belgium
Railway stations in East Flanders
Evergem